Launceston College may refer to:
Launceston College, Cornwall, a school in Launceston, Cornwall, England
Launceston College, Tasmania, a school in Launceston, Tasmania, Australia